Franconia is a ghost town in Putnam County, in the U.S. state of Ohio.

History
Franconia was laid out in 1837. A post office was established at Franconia in 1837, and remained in operation until 1867.

References

Geography of Putnam County, Ohio
Ghost towns in Ohio